Raimund Hörmann (born 27 May 1957 in Ulm, Baden-Württemberg) is a retired German rower who won a gold medal at the 1984 Summer Olympics in Los Angeles.

References

Rowers at the 1984 Summer Olympics
Olympic rowers of West Germany
Olympic gold medalists for West Germany
1957 births
Living people
Olympic medalists in rowing
West German male rowers
Medalists at the 1984 Summer Olympics
World Rowing Championships medalists for West Germany
Sportspeople from Ulm
20th-century German people